Asklepioceras is a genus in the Ceratitid family Arpaditidae from the Middle and Upper Triassic (Ladinian and Carnian stages) of Italy, Romania, Turkey, and British Columbia (Canada).

History 
The type species, Asklepioceras segmentatum was originally named as Arpadites segmentatus by Renz, 1910. In 1951, it was assigned to Asklepioceras by L. F. Spath. Founded in British Columbia in 1947, A. mahaffii was later synonymised with A. laurenci. Two more species, A. exilis and A. altilis, both from Canada, were described in 1994 by E. T. Tozer.

Description 
The genus is characterized by evolute to involute, discoidal to subglobular shells with a median (ventral) furrow not bordered by keels (in contrast to Dittmarites in which it is) and simple ceratitic sutures. (Arkell et al. 1962, L162) The genotype Asklepioceras segmentatus Renz, 1910,  based on Arpadites (Dittmarites) segmentatus Mojsisovics, 1893. is found in the Carnian of the Alps.

References

Further reading 
 Arkel et al., 1962. Mesozoic Ammonoidea, Treatise on Invertebrate Paleontology Part L, Mollusca 4, R.C. Moore (ed)
 E. T. Tozer. 1981. Triassic Ammonoidea: Classification, evolution and relationship with Permian and Jurassic Forms. The Ammonoidea: The evolution classification, mode of life and geological usefulness of a major fossil group 66-100
 J. J., J.r. Sepkoski. 2002. A compendium of fossil marine animal genera. Bulletins of American Paleontology 363:1-560

Trachyceratidae
Ceratitida genera
Middle Triassic ammonites
Ammonites of Europe
Ladinian first appearances
Carnian extinctions
Late Triassic ammonites